Sweet Talk is a 2013 American adventure drama film directed by Craig McMahon, starring John Way and Savanah D. McMahon.

Cast
 Natalie Zea as Delilah
 Jeffrey Vincent Parise as Samson
 John Glover as Professor / Count
 Lindsay Hollister as Ginny
 Karen Austin as Newsvender / Nurse
 Time Winters as Silent Man
 Anzu Lawson as Suzi Yamagutchi
 Andre Myers as Marcus
 Devion Andrez Coleman as Tremayne

Reception
Annlee Ellingson of the Los Angeles Times wrote that while Zea "gives a natural performance amid a neighborhood of painful stereotypes", she "doesn’t adjust her cadence, let alone accent, for the historical flashbacks, bringing a modern sensibility that limits the effectiveness of these scenes", while Parise is "reduced to talking to a pet bird to explain his emotions."

Joe Leydon of Variety called the film a "borderline embarrassing vanity project that brings out the worst in TV vet Peter Lefcourt" and wrote that Zea and Parise "bring impressive measures of conviction to laughable dialogue".

Gabe Toro of IndieWire gave the film a grade of "D-" and called it "very cheap, wholly unconvincing, and loaded with dull narration.".

References

External links
 
 

American adventure drama films
2010s adventure drama films